A Life of Sin is a 1979 Puerto Rican-American drama film directed by Efraín López Neris and starring Raul Julia, Míriam Colón and José Ferrer.

Premise
Paulo (Raul Julia), a Caribbean peasant and Isabel (Miriam Colon), a politician's mistress. Open a brothel that becomes internationally famous. Though they gain wealth and power, the one thing that Isabel goals continue to elude her.

Cast
Míriam Colón as Isabel Luberza Oppenheimer
Raul Julia as Paulo
Henry Darrow
Miguel Ángel Suárez as Mario
José Ferrer as The Bishop

References

External links
 
 

1979 films
American drama films
Puerto Rican films
1970s English-language films
1970s American films